The Language of Thieves and Vagabonds is an album by the band The Throbs. It was released by Geffen Records in 1991 and re-released in 2007. The 2007 Rock Candy reissue includes 2 bonus tracks: "Rainbow" and "The Queen of Borrowed Lights"

Track listing, 2007 release
"Underground"
"Come Down Sister"
"It's Not the End of the World"
"Dreamin'"
"Honeychild"
"Rip It Up"
"Ocean of Love"
"Only Way Out"
"Sweet Addiction"
"Ecstasy"
"Strange Behaviour"
"Rainbow" (bonus track on 2007 Rock Candy reissue)
"The Queen of Borrowed Lights" (bonus track on 2007 Rock Candy reissue)

Track list, 1991 release (as originally on vinyl & record tape)

SIDE A

 "Underground"
 "Come Down Sister"
 "It's Not the End of the World"
 "Dreamin'"
 "Honeychild"
 "Rip It Up"

SIDE B

 "Ocean of Love"
 "Only Way Out"
 "Sweet Addiction"
 "Ecstacy"
 "Strange Behavior"

Personnel
 Ronnie Sweetheart - lead vocals
 Roger Ericson - guitar
 Danny Nordahl - bass
 Ronnie Magri - drums

References

1991 debut albums
albums produced by Bob Ezrin
Geffen Records albums